Dar-ul-Madinah is an Islamic School System that aims to improve conventional academic studies in conformity with Shariah.

Head office

Faizan-e-Jeelan (for boys) 
 Project No. 7, Plot No. 171, Block 13/A, Near Gilani Masjid, Gulshan-e-Iqbal, Karachi, Pakistan

Faizan-e-Baghdad (for girls) 
 B-38 Block-4, Al-Hilal Society, University Road, Karachi, Pakistan

Sindh campuses list

Karachi 
 Plot No D-25 Al-Hilal Society, Opposite Askari Park
 House No. F-38/1, Block-8, behind Agha Super Store, Clifton
 Plot No. C-59, opposite Haider-e-Karrar Masjid, Block 2, Clifton (For Boys)
 Plot No. JM 705, Jamshed Road No. 3, opposite Yadgar Fish
 Plot No. C-45, Block No. 10, Ayesha Manzil, F.B Area
 Plot No. B-1, Block 3, near Faizan-e-Attar Masjid Gulshan-e-Iqbal
 House No. G-2, Block No. 13D/2, behind City Lawn, Gulshan-e-Iqbal
 Plot No. L-79, Street No. 1, Sector 32-E, near Nasir Colony, Korangi No. 1 (For Boys)
 House No. 157 & 152, Block No. 33-G, Korangi 2 ½
 Plot No. RB-6/79 Shafie Hall, Aram Bagh Road, Gadi Khata (For Girls)
 Plot No. G-2, Rafa e Aam Society, Malir Halt
 Plot No. 516, Sector 15-A, Shahedan-e-Watan School,Bangla Bazar, Orangi Town
 Plot No. B-16, Street 22, Sector 5-M, North Karachi (For Boys)
 Plot No. L-79, Street No. 1, Sector 32-E, near Nasir Colony, Korangi No. 1
 House No. 157 & 152, Block No. 33-G, Korangi 2 ½
 Plot No. R-1388, Sector No. 1-A,  Opposite Parking Plaza, Lines Area

Hyderabad 
 Plot No. 46/1, Near OPD Hospital, near Jaikab Road. (For Boys)
 Yahyaa House Street, Al-Madinah Attar Cold Corner, near Shahzaib Medical Store, Pathan Colony Road.
 Plot No. 114/A-2439 near Mehran Dairy Jail Road.
 House # 169/3 Building near Wali Arcade Jahan Plaza Jama Masjid St: Saddar. (For Girls)
 Plot No. 27, Block-A, Unit No. 9, near Board Office, Latifabad.
 Plot No. C-248, Block B, Unit No. 9, Latifabad.

Larkana 
 House No. 18/1, Shahbaaz Colony, Main Shah Nawaz Bhutto Road, near Chandka Bridge. (For Boys)
 House No. 18/1, Shahbaaz Colony, Main Shah Nawaz Bhutto Road, near Chandka Bridge.

Sukkhar 
 House No. B-1066, near Rehmat Nihari House, Jinnah Chowk, Bunder Road.

Shahdadpur 
 House No. 226, 227, Housing Society, near Khizra Jama Masjid, Shahdadpur

Tando Adam 
 House No 543/12 near Askari Bank, Hyderabad Road, Tando Adam

Punjab campuses list

 Dar-ul-Madinah (Islamic School) Gulistan Chowk, Multan
 Dar-ul-Madinah (Islamic School) Madinah Town, Faisalabad
 Dar-ul-Madinah (Islamic School) Raza Abad, Faisalabad
 Dar-ul-Madinah (Islamic School) Gulzar-e-Tayyaba, Sargodha
 Dar-ul-Madinah (Islamic School) Defense Town, Bhalwal
 Dar-ul-Madinah (Islamic School) Township, Lahore
 Dar-ul-Madinah (Islamic School) Sabzazar, Lahore
 Dar-ul-Madinah (Islamic School) Taj Bagh, Lahore
 Dar-ul-Madinah (Islamic School) Shawala Chowk, Lahore
 Dar-ul-Madinah (Islamic School) Satellite Town, Rawalpindi
 Dar-ul-Madinah (Islamic School) Harley Street, Rawalpindi
 Dar-ul-Madinah (Islamic School) Ahmed Raza, Rawalpindi
 Dar-ul-Madinah (Islamic School) Wah Cantt, Wah Cantt
 Dar-ul-Madinah (Islamic School) Rehman Shaheed Road, Gujrat
 Dar-ul-Madinah (Islamic School System) Pakpura, Sialkot
 Dar-ul-Madinah (Islamic School System) Rangers Colony, Mandi-Baha-Udin
 Dar-ul-Madinah (Islamic School System) Dinga, [(Gujrat)]

Boys Secondary School 
 Dar-ul-Madinah (Boys Secondary School) Khadim Ali Road, Sialkot
 Dar-ul-Madinah (Boys Secondary School) Rehman Shaheed Road, Gujrat
 Dar-ul-Madinah (Boys Secondary School) New Karachi
 Dar-ul-Madinah (Boys Secondary School) Korangi, Karachi
 Dar-ul-Madinah (Boys Secondary School) Orangi Town, Karachi
 Dar-ul-Madinah (Boys Secondary School) Saddar, Karachi
 Dar-ul-Madinah (Boys Secondary School) Afandi Town, Hyderabad
 Dar-ul-Madinah (Boys Secondary School) Munirabad, Multan
 Dar-ul-Madinah (Boys Secondary School) Madinah Town, Faisalabad

Girls Secondary School 
 Dar-ul-Madinah (Girls Secondary School) Aram bagh, Karachi
 Dar-ul-Madinah (Girls Secondary School) Korangi, Karachi
 Dar-ul-Madinah (Girls Secondary School) Saddar, Karachi

Overseas 
 Dar-ul-Madinah (Islamic School) California, United States
 Dar-ul-Madinah (Islamic School) in India: Agra, Akola, Ahmedabad, Delhi, Himatnagar, Modasa, Mumbai, Nagpur, Pune, Rajouri.
 Dar-ul-Madinah (Islamic School System) Govandi, Mumbai, India
 Dar-ul-Madinah (Islamic School System) Khadak, Mumbai, India
 Dar-Ul Madinah, Saidpur Campus, Bangladesh

United Kingdom
 Dar-Ul Madinah Nursery Blackburn, UK
 London, 238 Romford Road
 Rotherham, 1 Maltkiln Street Rotherham
 Slough, 50 Darvills Lane Slough

See also
Dawat-e-Islami

References

External links

Dawat-e-Islami
Islamic schools in Pakistan
Islamic schools in India
Barelvi